YMCA Training, Inc. is a non-profit organization in Boston that provides access to employment to low-income, unemployed adults through technical and office support skills training. The Boston program is part of a national network of local job training organizations called Training, Inc. National Association, which provides resources to organizations in the workforce development field. Other Training, Inc. member sites are currently located in Chicago, Indianapolis, and Newark.

The Process

The Process for Job Seekers
YMCA Training, Inc. helps unemployed or underemployed individuals gain access to a full-time professional career with family-supported wages and benefits. Individuals come to YMCA Training, Inc. to take part in its 20-week-long, tuition-free program. Trainees learn office and computer skills including MS Office Suite, data entry and keyboarding, and customer service skills.  Trainees pursue a specialization in one of three fields: administrative assistance, financial services/insurance, or medical office support. The workplace Business Simulations  distinguish YMCA Training, Inc. from other workforce development programs. For three weeks, trainees "work" in "departments" of virtual companies, receiving customer service complaints, processing orders, managing projects, and keeping records. Volunteers and staff challenge trainees in a high-pressure environment that simulates a real workplace. Trainees are placed in an eight-week internship with a local Boston business where they learn valuable professional skills in a hands-on environment. Trainees receive coaching in the job search process throughout the entire program, through practice interviewing and resume/cover letter workshops provided by volunteers from the business world and a network of committed mentors.

The Process for Employers
YMCA Training, Inc.'s success is largely due to strong partnerships with local Boston area businesses. Businesses host job seekers as interns for 8 weeks, and hire graduates as paid full-time employees. Many employers are attracted to the program because they are able to evaluate the trainee in an eight-week internship before considering him or her as a candidate for a full-time employment. The business community trusts YMCA Training, Inc.'s program because the program stresses high standards and high performance.  YMCA Training, Inc. also demands a high level of English proficiency, so many trainees choose to go through YMCA's International Learning Center before enrollment at YMCA Training, Inc.

Results and Impacts

Results: 4,500 graduates. Over 120 companies hired a YMCA Training, Inc. graduate in the past 2 years. 80% job placement rate, 85% of graduates retain their job for over 1 year

Impact: $95.5 million earned by graduates last year. $25.5 million taxes paid by graduates last year. $1.2 million was saved in just the past two years in public assistance and unemployment payments as recipients gained new employment. YMCA Training, Inc. graduates' monthly income nearly triples with their first job after training

Employers
Employers are businesses that represent a variety of fields such as:
 Education: Suffolk University, Boston University, Northeastern University, MIT
 Finance: Eastern Bank, BNY Mellon, Sovereign Bank, Wainwright Bank
 Government: City of Boston, Commonwealth of Massachusetts
 Health care: Boston Medical Center, Tufts Medical Center, Dana Farber Cancer Institute, Massachusetts General Hospital, Beth Israel Deaconess, Children's Hospital of Boston, East Boston Neighborhood Health Center
 Staffing Agencies:  Adecco, John Leonard Employment, Hollister Inc, Total Clerical Services
 Insurance: Eastern Insurance, Neighborhood Health Plan, One Beacon Insurance, DentaQuest Services, Massachusetts Behavioral Health Partnership

References 

Non-profit organizations based in Boston